The 2014–15 Tahiti Ligue 1 was the 68th season of the Tahiti Ligue 1 organized by the Tahitian Football Federation since its establishment in 1948.

League table

Championship playoff

References

Tahiti Ligue 1 seasons
Tahiti
Tahiti
Ligue 1
Ligue 1